Ivaylo Dimitrov may refer to:

 Ivaylo Dimitrov (footballer, born 1987), Bulgarian football right back for Lokomotiv Plovdiv
 Ivaylo Dimitrov (footballer, born 1989), Bulgarian football winger for Dobrudzha Dobrich